The sailing competitions at the 2017 Southeast Asian Games took place at the National Sailing Centre in Langkawi.

Medal table

Medalists

Men

Women

Mixed

References

External links
  

Sailing at the Southeast Asian Games
2017 Southeast Asian Games events
South